Yangere is a Ubangian language of the Central African Republic. It is closely related to Central Banda.

References

Languages of the Central African Republic
Banda languages